Beng Quan (pinyin romanization) or Peng Ch'uan (Wade–Giles) is the third of five dynamics or fists in the art of Xingyiquan. Each dynamic consists of a single attack method and a turn. One normally practices four to five of the attacks, a turn, and the attacks again. Performing the five fists in this way, in sequence, is called Wuxing or "Five Forms".

Translated as "crushing" or "smashing" fist, Beng Quan is the most straightforward of the  Xingyi dynamics, performed either as a grasp and strike or as a pair of strikes with the fist. The strikes are unified with the forward, three-step motion of the body. Two steps drive the fist forward. The third, or follow-step, brings the body into position for the next strike. The legs, which are strengthened in standing exercises, santishi, are kept bent and use the compression and release of the long muscles. The strikes or blows are driven up in a diagonal from the muscles of the rear foot, through the muscles of the torso and out the striking arm. This all combines to give Beng Quan a simple and straightforward power which utilises the entire body's momentum and mass.

Notes 
 Xing Yi Quan Xue by Sun Lutang, 1915, published in pre-revolutionary China. Currently available in a Chinese version that combines all five of his books.
 The Study of Form-Mind Boxing by Sun Lutang, translated by Albert Liu, 2000, Unique Publications
 Hsing-i, Chinese Mind-Body Boxing by Robert W. Smith, 1974, 2003, North Atlantic Books

Chinese martial arts
Xingyiquan